John M. Essigman is an American chemist, currently the William R. & Betsy P. Leitch Professor in Residence of Chemistry, Toxicology, and Biological Engineering at the Massachusetts Institute of Technology.

References

Year of birth missing (living people)
Living people
MIT School of Engineering faculty
21st-century American chemists
Northeastern University alumni